Heterogeneous nuclear ribonucleoprotein K (also protein K) is a protein that in humans is encoded by the HNRNPK gene. It is found in the cell nucleus that binds to pre-messenger RNA (mRNA) as a component of heterogeneous ribonucleoprotein particles. The simian homolog is known as protein H16. Both proteins bind to single-stranded DNA as well as to RNA and can stimulate the activity of RNA polymerase II, the protein responsible for most gene transcription. The relative affinities of the proteins for DNA and RNA vary with solution conditions and are inversely correlated, so that conditions promoting strong DNA binding result in weak RNA binding.

RNA binding protein domains in other proteins that are similar to the RNA binding domain of protein K are called K-homology or KH domains.

Protein K has been the subject of study related to colorectal cancer, in which an RNA editing event inducing the expression of an isoform containing a point mutation was found to be specific to cancerous cells.

Function 

This gene belongs to the subfamily of ubiquitously expressed heterogeneous nuclear ribonucleoproteins (hnRNPs). The hnRNPs are RNA-binding proteins, and they complex with heterogeneous nuclear RNA (hnRNA). These proteins are associated with pre-mRNAs in the nucleus and appear to influence pre-mRNA processing and other aspects of mRNA metabolism and transport. While all of the hnRNPs are present in the nucleus, some seem to shuttle between the nucleus and the cytoplasm.

The hnRNP proteins have distinct nucleic acid binding properties. The protein encoded by this gene is located in the nucleoplasm and has three repeats of KH domains that binds to RNAs. It is distinct among other hnRNP proteins in its binding preference; it binds tenaciously to poly(C). This protein is also thought to have a role during cell cycle progression. Multiple alternatively spliced transcript variants have been described for this gene, but only three variants have been fully described.

Mutations in both copies of HNRNPK are embryonic lethal in mice. Mice with both copies of the gene knocked out die before the 14th day of embryonic development.

Clinical significance

Okamoto syndrome 
Mutations in HNRNPK cause Okamoto syndrome, also known as Au–Kline syndrome.

Blood cancers 
Deletions in the region encompassing HNRNPK have been found in the cells of acute myeloid leukemia in approximately 2% of cases. Additionally, a majority of mice who have had one of their HNRNPK genes artificially knocked out developed myeloid cancers, with a third developing lymphoid cancers and 4% developing hepatocellular carcinomas. The mice were also smaller, had less developed organs and had higher postnatal mortality (30%). The median lifespan of the mice that survived was less than 50% that of wild-type mice. Deficiencies in HNRNPK appear to specifically reduce the levels of the p42 isoform of CEBPA, which is a transcription factor involved in the differentiation of certain blood cells, as well as p21 (cyclin-dependent kinase inhibitor 1), which is involved in pausing cell development for DNA repair.

HNRNPK overexpression also appears to contribute to cancers via a different mechanism involving translation rather than transcription.

Interactions 

HNRPK has been shown to interact with:
 CSK,
 DDX1, 
 HNRNPL, 
 KHDRBS1, 
 PCBP2, 
 PRMT1, and
 PTBP1.

Human proteins containing a KH domain

AKAP1;     ANKHD1;    ANKRD17;   ASCC1;     BICC1;     DDX43;     DDX53;     DPPA5;
FMR1;      FUBP1;     FUBP3;     FXR1;      FXR2;      HDLBP;     HNRPK;     IGF2BP1;
IGF2BP2;   IGF2BP3;   KHDRBS1;   KHDRBS2;   KHDRBS3;   KHSRP;     KRR1;      MEX3A;
MEX3B;     MEX3C;     MEX3D;     NOVA1;     NOVA2;     PCBP1;     PCBP2;     PCBP3;
PCBP4;     PNO1;      PNPT1;     QKI;       SF1;       TDRKH;

References

Further reading

External links 
 

RNA-binding proteins